The 2015–16 Fresno State Bulldogs men's basketball team represented California State University, Fresno during the 2015–16 NCAA Division I men's basketball season. This was head coach Rodney Terry's fifth season at Fresno State. The Bulldogs played their home games at Save Mart Center and were members of the Mountain West Conference. They finished the season 25–10, 13–5 in Mountain West play to finish in second place. They defeated UNLV, Colorado State and San Diego State to be champions of the Mountain West tournament. They earned the conference's automatic bid to the NCAA tournament where they lost in the first round to Utah.

Previous season
The Bulldogs finished the season 15–17, 10–8 in Mountain West play to finish in sixth place. They lost in the quarterfinals of the Mountain West tournament to Colorado State.

Departures

Incoming Transfers

Recruiting Class of 2015

Recruiting Class of 2016

Roster

Schedule and results
Source

|-
!colspan=9 style="background:#; color:white;"| Exhibition

|-
!colspan=9 style="background:#; color:white;"| Non-conference regular season

|-
!colspan=9 style="background:#; color:white;"| Mountain West regular season

|-
!colspan=9 style="background:#; color:white;"| Mountain West tournament

|-
!colspan=9 style="background:#; color:white;"| NCAA tournament

See also
2015–16 Fresno State Bulldogs women's basketball team

References

Fresno State
Fresno State Bulldogs men's basketball seasons
Fresno State Bulldogs men's bask
Fresno State Bulldogs men's bask
Fresno State